Stal Alchevsk Stadium is a multi-use stadium in Alchevsk, Ukraine.  It is currently used mostly for football matches, and is the home of FC Stal Alchevsk. The stadium holds 9,200 people.

The stadium is located in a city park, entrance to which is decorated by an arc. There also located a club's restaurant "Stal". The stadium has an electronic scoreboard.

In June 2013, the stadium was the reason FC Stal Alchevsk refused its promotion to the Ukrainian Premier League. Because at the time did not meet the requirements of the highest Ukrainian division and the club did not want to play in another stadium because it saw "no point in holding matches in another stadium as most fans of Stal won’t see them".

References

External links
 Stal Stadium at the FC Stal Alchevsk's website

Football venues in Ukraine
Sport in Alchevsk
Sports venues in Luhansk Oblast